The som, sum, or soum is a unit of currency used in  Turkic-speaking countries in Central Asia. Its name comes from words in the respective languages (including Kazakh, Kyrgyz, Uyghur and Uzbek) for "pure", referring to historical coins of pure gold. It may refer to:
 Kyrgyzstani som
 Uzbekistani soʻm

Speakers of Kazakh, Kyrgyz and Uzbek in the then Soviet Union called the ruble by these names, and were accommodated by the word appearing on the backs of banknotes. The som of Kyrgyzstan and som of Uzbekistan are post-Soviet examples.

In the Golden Horde
In the 14th century the Golden Horde som called silver bullion navicular shape, weighing 204.8 g (in Russian numismatic literature, they are also called Tatar hryvnya). In treasures, archeologists find them together with silver dirhams. Florentine Francesco Pegolotti wrote that the mint in Azak could stamp a bar in the "walking" coin.

References 

Denominations (currency)
Currencies of Asia